Leri Kenchadze (born 16 August 1986) is a Georgian-Bulgarian former competitive pair skater. With Elizaveta Makarova, he is the 2013 Toruń Cup champion, the 2015 Bavarian Open bronze medalist, and a four-time Bulgarian national champion.

Personal life 
Leri Kenchadze was born 16 August 1986 in Tbilisi, Georgian SSR, Soviet Union. He is the twin brother of Georgi Kenchadze. After living in Bulgaria for over a decade, he moved to Denmark in 2015. In 2017 he moved to the Netherlands.

Career 
Kenchadze competed for Bulgaria throughout his career. He appeared as a single skater through the 2005–06 season.

Kenchadze began competing in pair skating in the 2006–07 season, partnering Nina Ivanova. In 2009–10, he skated with Alexandra Goncharuk, placing seventh at the 2009 NRW Trophy and second at the Bulgarian Championships. The following season, he partnered Alexandra Malakhova. Coached by Pavel Kitashev, the pair won silver at the 2011 Toruń Cup and placed 22nd at the 2011 World Championships in Moscow.

In 2011, Kenchadze teamed up with Elizaveta Makarova. The pair trained in Sofia, coached by Hristo Turlakov and Andrei Lutai. Makarova/Kenchadze competed at four European Championships and three World Championships. They became the first ever pair from Bulgaria to perform a throw triple jump and triple twist successfully at European and World Championships.

Kenchadze retired from competitive skating after the 2014–15 season. He is a head coach at Skøjteklub København in Copenhagen, Denmark. He joined the club in August 2015.

Programs

With Makarova

With Malakhova

Competitive highlights 
CS: Challenger Series; JGP: Junior Grand Prix

With Makarova

With Ivanova, Goncharuk, and Malakhova

Single skating

References

External links 

 

1986 births
Bulgarian pair skaters
Georgian
Georgian emigrants to Bulgaria
Living people
Sportspeople from Tbilisi
Figure skaters from Sofia
Twin sportspeople